Jorge Andrés Ayala Iraola (born March 14, 1989) is a Uruguayan footballer who plays as a defender for GC Biaschesi in Switzerland.

External links
 Profile at soccerway

1989 births
Living people
Footballers from Montevideo
Uruguayan footballers
Association football defenders
Central Español players